Anshi Balapan (Әнші Балапан) is a Kazakh national televised talent search for children as young as 15, it was started in 1990 and is a precursor to the popular worldwide Idols spin off SuperStar KZ. The program was broadcast on КТК TV CHANNEL between 1997 and 2005.

Famous participants
Altynay Sapargalieva
Madina Saduaqasova

Kazakhstani television shows